Mashtabandali is a former Village development committee in Achham District in the Seti Zone of western Nepal. At the time of the 1991 Nepal census, the village had a population of 1995 living in 350 houses. At the time of the 2001 Nepal census, the population was 2004, of which 31% was literate. Mashtanamdali now is part of Kamalbazar Municipality which was established in 2014.

References

Populated places in Achham District
Village development committees in Achham District